Sister Double Happiness was an alternative blues rock band that existed from 1986 until 1995, formed in San Francisco, CA, United States. Its core members were Gary Floyd and Lynn Perko, who were in the seminal punk rock band The Dicks, and Ben Cohen of the Pop-O-Pies.

Sister Double Happiness recorded and released four LPs, one EP, and one live record in its nine-year existence. After they disbanded, Floyd went on to front Black Kali Ma and recorded solo material. Perko later joined Imperial Teen.

Members

Heart and Mind
Gary Floyd - vocals and harmonica.
Lynn Perko - drums, percussion, piano and organs.
Ben Cohen - guitar, mandolin, and 6 string bass.
Jeff Palmer - bass guitar

Uncut and self-titled EP
Gary Floyd - vocals
Lynn Perko - drums
Ben Cohen - guitar
Danny Roman - guitar
Miles Montalbano - bass

Discography

Studio recordings
Sister Double Happiness LP, SST, 1988
Heart and Mind LP, Reprise, 1991
Hey Kids Maxi Single, Reprise, 1992
Uncut LP, Warner Chapel Music, 1993 (reissued on Dutch East India Trading)
Sister Double Happiness EP, Warner Chapel Music, 1993 (reissued on Dutch East India Trading)
Horsey Water LP, Sub-Pop, 1994

Live recordings

Audio
A Stone's Throw from Love (Live and Acoustic at the Great American Music Hall 06/17/92), Innerstate, 1999

Video
A live concert video Sister Double Happiness Live: Greetings from Zurich was released on Studio K7 home video in the mid 1990s, taped from a show on September 24, 1993. The set list included songs from both Sister Double Happiness and the Dicks:
Bobby Shannon
Don't Worry
Lightning
Ashes
Exposed to You
San Diego
Freight Train
You Don't Know Me
Whipping Song
No Good For You
Dicks Hate Police
Two-Headed Dog

Post-breakup
After the dissolution of Sister Double Happiness, Floyd formed and primarily played in Europe with the blues group The Gary Floyd Band; an overview of this material, Backdoor Preacher Man, is available in the United States.

Floyd and Sister Double Happiness guitarist Danny Roman formed Black Kali Ma, a blues-punk act that recorded an LP for Alternative Tentacles in 1999. Drummer Bruce Ducheneaux (Assassins of God) and guitar player Matt Margolin (Smokin' Rhythm Prawns) joined Roman and Floyd in Black Kali Ma. Rolling Stone Magazine reviewed Black Kali Ma's album and gave it three stars.

Gary Floyd is now in a band called the Buddha Brothers, and has recorded solo as a country musician. Perko went on to become a member of indie rock band Imperial Teen in 1996, and appears on You Ride The Pony (I'll Be The Bunny).

Ben continues to record and perform as Benjamin Cohen; his latest album is available online.

References

Alternative rock groups from California
American blues rock musical groups
LGBT-themed musical groups
Musical groups established in 1986
Musical groups disestablished in 1995
Musical groups from San Francisco
Sub Pop artists
Punk blues musical groups
1986 establishments in California